The Archies is the debut studio album by The Archies, a fictional pop band from the Archie comics. The album was originally released on the Calendar Records label in 1968 and included 12 songs. It was produced by Jeff Barry and co-produced by Don Kirshner. The band's debut single was "Bang-Shang-A-Lang"; it peaked at No. 22 on the Billboard Hot 100 in 1968.  The album peaked on the Billboard 200 chart at number 88. The song "Seventeen Ain't Young" became a Top 40 hit in Australia for Frank Howson in 1969.

Track listing
 "Archie's Theme (Everything's Archie)" (Jeff Barry)
 "Boys and Girls" (Jeff Barry)
 "Time for Love" (Mark Barkan, Ritchie Adams)
 "You Make Me Wanna Dance" (Jeff Barry)
 "La Dee Doo Down Down" (Jeff Barry)
 "Truck Driver" (Jeff Barry)
 "Catchin' Up On Fun" (Mark Barkan, Ritchie Adams)
 "I'm in Love" (Jeff Barry)
 "Seventeen Ain't Young" (Jeff Barry)
 "Ride, Ride, Ride" (Jeff Barry)
 "Hide and Seek" (Mark Barkan, Ritchie Adams)
 "Bang-Shang-A-Lang" (Jeff Barry)

Session personnel
Vocals: Ron Dante
Drums: Gary Chester
Guitars: Dave Appell
Bass guitar: Joey Macho
Keyboards: Ron Frangipane

Chart positions
Album

Singles

References

1968 debut albums
The Archies albums
Albums produced by Jeff Barry
Albums produced by Don Kirshner